España Fútbol Clube  is a Salvadoran professional football club based in San Buenaventura, Usulután, El Salvador.

The club currently plays in the Salvadoran Third Division.

Espana changed their name from Espana Futbol Clube to Clube Deportivo Espana.

Honours

Domestic honours
 Segunda División Salvadorean and predecessors 
 Champions (1) : TBD
 Tercera División Salvadorean and predecessors 
 Champions:(1) : TBD

Notable Players
  Alfredo Machuca

List of coaches
  Denis Waldemar Moreno (actualidad)

External links
 

Espana